Alvin Johnson (born 1941) is an American serial killer linked to three murders across three states from 1972 to 1983. Officially convicted in two homicides in Oregon and Utah, he was later linked to a third one committed with fellow serial killer Wilbur Lee Jennings in California, but was not charged due to his current life sentence in Utah.

Early life
Alvin Johnson was born in 1941 in Smithville, Texas, one of 14 children born to poor tenant farmers. When he was young, Johnson was accidentally struck with the head of an axe handle, which thereafter caused him to have  bouts of amnesia and dizziness, and is also said to have displayed symptoms of schizophrenia. In his adulthood, he became a transient and travelled cross-country, surviving by working as a laborer on various farms.

Murders

Roger Geller
On September 26, 1972, Johnson was in Klamath Falls, Oregon, when he broke into the hotel room 50-year-old Roger E. Geller, a cook who had recently quit his job to return to his home state of Nebraska. He beat Geller on the head and finally strangled him, before stealing his wallet and money and then fleeing the hotel. The victim's body was discovered by a maid on the following day.

The day after Geller's murder, Johnson was arrested and charged with the crime. For the next few months, he was kept in the city's jail to await trial, but on January 1, 1973, Johnson and another inmate, 35-year-old Wolfred Dean Hill, attempted to escape. After managing to lock their jailer in a supply closet, the pair stole two knives and overpowered a police officer, but in the ensuing scuffle, Johnson was shot in the shoulder. They nevertheless stole his gun and then fled in a patrol car, but each was recaptured only a few hours after their attempted escape - Johnson was left abandoned at a ditch, while Hill surrendered at a basketball court when surrounded by police. Sometime after his recapture, Johnson was tried, convicted of manslaughter, and sentenced to 10 years imprisonment.

Clarice Reinke
In early 1983, Johnson was released from prison after serving the entirety of his sentence. He continued travelling around the country, until he eventually found himself at a rescue mission in Fresno, California. While living there, under as of yet unclear circumstances, he partnered up with Wilbur Lee Jennings, a local serial killer known for preying on prostitutes. On June 23, 1983, the two men travelled to Easton and broke into the home of 76-year-old Clarice Lula Reinke, whom they proceeded to rape and then strangle to death. At the time, neither man was considered a suspect and the murder quickly became a cold case; for unknown reasons, Johnson and Jennings went their separate ways, with the former continuing his travels cross-country.

James Clark
In early August, Johnson arrived in Salt Lake City, Utah, where on August 7, he kidnapped 38-year-old James M. Clark and his wife Ann Lee, who were visiting from Texas. He kept the pair in a warehouse, before ordering James to undress himself and tying him up. Johnson then beat him into unconsciousness with a shovel handle before slapping Ann, and ordering her to do the same. When she did, Johnson proceeded to rape her. After he finished, he again grabbed the shovel handle and beat James to death, before knocking Ann into unconsciousness and then leaving the premises.

After she came about, Ann managed to free herself, put on her husband's clothes and go to the nearest police station, where she described what had happened. An arrest warrant was issued for Johnson, who was arrested on the following day aboard a freight train in Lincoln, Nebraska. Despite his intention on fighting extradition proceedings, Johnson was brought back to Utah to stand trial for the case.

Trial and imprisonment
Johnson's trial began the following year. During proceedings, it was determined that he had an intellectual disability and had chronic alcoholism which heavily influenced him at the time of the murder, and thusly, he was spared the death penalty and sentenced to two life sentences with a chance of parole instead.

Alvin Johnson's parole was scheduled for June 9, 2009. However, the year before that, his and Jennings' DNA was linked to the Reinke murder thanks to DNA tests conducted on semen samples left by the perpetrators. However, neither man would stand trial for her murder - Jennings died in 2014 before he could be put on trial for any of his murder, while Johnson was presumably never charged with the case, on account of his existing life sentence in Utah. As of October 2021, it is unclear whether he remains in prison, or if he is even still alive.

See also
 Wilbur Lee Jennings
 List of serial killers in the United States

References

1941 births
20th-century American criminals
American male criminals
American people convicted of manslaughter
American people convicted of murder
American people convicted of rape
American prisoners sentenced to life imprisonment
American rapists
American serial killers
Criminals from Texas
Living people
Male serial killers
People convicted of murder by Utah
People from Smithville, Texas
People with schizophrenia
Prisoners sentenced to life imprisonment by Utah